María Magdalena: Pecadora de Magdala ("Mary Magdalene: Sinner of Magdala") is a 1946 Mexican film portraying the companion of Jesus Christ and his apostles, Mary Magdalene. It stars Luis Alcoriza.

External links
 

1946 films
1940s Spanish-language films
Films directed by Miguel Contreras Torres
Mexican black-and-white films
Portrayals of Mary Magdalene in film
Mexican drama films
1946 drama films
Portrayals of Jesus in film
1940s Mexican films